The 2012–13 CCHL season was the 52nd season of the Central Canada Hockey League (CCHL). The twelve teams of the CCHL played 62-game schedules.

Come March, the top teams of the league played down for the Bogart Cup, the CCHL championship.  The winner of the Bogart Cup competed in the Eastern Canadian Junior "A" championship, the Fred Page Cup.  If successful against the winners of the Quebec Junior AAA Hockey League and Maritime Hockey League, the champion would then move on to play in the Canadian Junior Hockey League championship, the 2013 Royal Bank Cup.

Changes 
None

Current Standings 
Note: GP = Games played; W = Wins; L = Losses; OTL = Overtime losses; SL = Shootout losses; GF = Goals for; GA = Goals against; PTS = Points; x = clinched playoff berth; y = clinched division title; z = clinched conference title

Teams listed on the official league website.

Standings listed on official league website.

2012-13 Bogart Cup Playoffs

Playoff results are listed on the official league website.

Fred Page Cup Championship
Hosted by the Truro Bearcats in Truro, Nova Scotia.  The Cornwall Colts finished 3rd.

Round Robin
Summerside Western Capitals (MHL) 1 - Cornwall Colts 0
Truro Bearcats (MHL) 6 - Cornwall Colts 2
Cornwall Colts 5 - Longueuil College Francais (QJAAAHL) 4

Semi-final
Summerside Western Capitals (MHL) 1 - Cornwall Colts 0 OT

Scoring leaders 
Note: GP = Games played; G = Goals; A = Assists; Pts = Points; PIM = Penalty minutes

Leading goaltenders 
Note: GP = Games played; Mins = Minutes played; W = Wins; L = Losses: OTL = Overtime losses; SL = Shootout losses; GA = Goals Allowed; SO = Shutouts; GAA = Goals against average

Players selected in 2013 NHL Entry Draft
Rd 6 #179 Blaine Byron - Pittsburgh Penguins (Smiths Falls Bears)

Awards
Most Valuable Player - Michael Pontarelli (Cornwall Colts)
Most Sportsmanlike - Michael Pontarelli (Cornwall Colts)
Leading Scorer - Michael Pontarelli (Cornwall Colts)
Top Rookie - Kelly Summers (Carleton Place Canadians)
Top Graduating Player - Ben Blasko (Brockville Braves)
Top Defenceman - Curtis Watson (Kanata Stallions)
Top Prospect - Blaine Byron (Smiths Falls Bears)
Top Goaltender - Carmine Guerrero (Hawkesbury Hawks)
Top Coach - Rick Dorval (Ottawa Jr. Senators)
Top General Manager - Jason Clarke (Carleton Place Canadians)

See also 
 2013 Royal Bank Cup
 Fred Page Cup
 Quebec Junior AAA Hockey League
 Maritime Junior Hockey League
 2012 in ice hockey
 2013 in ice hockey

References

External links 
 Official website of the Central Hockey League
 Official website of the Canadian Junior Hockey League

CCHL
2012